The Australian Roll of Renown was inaugurated by Radio 2TM in 1976. The award honours Australian and New Zealander musicians who have shaped the music industry by making a significant and lasting contribution to Country Music. The award is determined by an independent selection panel, set up under Chairmanship of Max Ellis, one of the original founders of the Roll of Renown, the Awards and the Festival. The inductee is announced at the Country Music Awards of Australia in Tamworth in January.

List of inductees

References

1976 establishments in Australia
Halls of fame in Australia
CMMA